Acnemia is a genus of fly belonging to the family Mycetophilidae.

The genus was first described by Winnertz in 1863.

The genus has almost cosmopolitan distribution.

Species
Acnemia aino Okada, 1939
Acnemia angusta Zaitzev, 1982
Acnemia anoena Winnertz, 1863
Acnemia arizonensis Zaitzev, 1982
Acnemia asiatica Senior-White, 1924
Acnemia bifida Zaitzev, 1982
Acnemia bolsuisi Meunier, 1904
Acnemia bolsuisii Meunier, 1904
Acnemia braueri Strobl, 1895
Acnemia californiensis Zaitzev, 1982
Acnemia comata Zaitzev, 1982
Acnemia cyclosma Cockerell, 1924
Acnemia defecta (Walker, 1856)
Acnemia falcata Zaitzev, 1982
Acnemia falkei Matile & Vockeroth, 1977
Acnemia fisherae Zaitzev, 1982
Acnemia flaveola Coquillett, 1901
Acnemia flavicoxa Freeman, 1951
Acnemia freemani Lane, 1956
Acnemia funerea Freeman, 1951
Acnemia hyrcanica Zaitzev, 1984
Acnemia johannseni Zaitzev, 1982
Acnemia kurilensis Zaitzev, 2001
Acnemia longipalpis Zaitzev, 2006
Acnemia longipes Winnertz, 1863
Acnemia macroclada Niu & Wu, 2010
Acnemia neolongipes Zaitzev, 1982
Acnemia nigra Strobl, 1895
Acnemia nitidicollis (Meigen, 1818)
Acnemia psylla Loew, 1870
Acnemia sarmentacea Niu & Wu, 2010
Acnemia similis Zaitzev, 1982
Acnemia simplex Cockerell, 1921
Acnemia spathulata Zaitzev, 2001
Acnemia stellamicans Chandler, 1994
Acnemia subtenebrosa Zaitzev, 1994
Acnemia trifida Zaitzev, 1982
Acnemia umbonala Niu & Wu, 2010
Acnemia unica Zaitzev, 1982
Acnemia ussuriensis Zaitzev, 1982
Acnemia varipennis Coquillett, 1904
Acnemia vittata Freeman, 1951
Acnemia vockerothi Zaitzev, 1989
Acnemia vratzatica Bechev, 1985
Acnemia weigandi Plassmann, 1999

References

Mycetophilidae
Sciaroidea genera
Diptera of Europe
Diptera of Asia
Diptera of North America
Diptera of South America
Taxa named by Johannes Winnertz